Elvis' Gold Records Volume 4 is a greatest hits album by American rock and roll singer Elvis Presley, issued by RCA Victor in mono and stereo, LPM/LSP 3921, in January 1968, with recording sessions taking place over an eight-year span at RCA Studio B in Nashville, Tennessee, and at RCA Studios and Radio Recorders in Hollywood. It is a compilation of hit singles released between 1961 and 1967, peaking at number 33 on the Billboard 200. It was certified Gold on March 27, 1992, by the Recording Industry Association of America.

Content
Although he had remained a popular artist since the release Elvis' Golden Records Volume 3 (1963), placing eight albums in the Top Ten and 17 singles in the Top 40 Presley's sales had cooled off since his heyday. The compilation album Elvis for Everyone (1965) was his first to sell under 300,000 copies, and his last five soundtrack albums had all done progressively worse in the marketplace, units shifted dropping to under 200,000. Singles were no longer reaching the Top 40 automatically, and while his recent single "Big Boss Man" sold 350,000, that fell short of the needed 500,000 to qualify for gold status in US singles sales. Usually a guaranteed seller, this volume sold only 400,000 copies; better than his recent soundtrack albums, but well off the mark set by its three predecessors. Colonel Tom Parker's ignorance of popular music trends and styles and Presley's unwavering loyalty to Parker were ruining Presley's career.

Elvis' Gold Records Volume 4 comprises five Top 40 A-sides along with seven b-sides, five of which also made the Top 40. Three songs had not been written expressly for Presley: "Love Letters" came from the 1945 film of the same name; "Witchcraft" had been a 1956 hit record for The Spiders; and "What'd I Say" was the Ray Charles classic from 1959. Three B-sides, "Lonely Man", "A Mess of Blues", and "Just Tell Her Jim Said Hello" were old enough to have been included on Elvis' Golden Records Volume 3, and another b-side, "Ain't That Loving You Baby", came from RCA's furlough session of June 10, 1958, set up to augment their stock of Presley product while their star was in the United States Army.

The first three Gold Records volumes covered two to three years of singles releases, but there was a five-year gap between this and the previous volume. This would be the last of the series issued during Presley's lifetime. Elvis' Gold Records Volume 5, which included singles from 1969 to 1977, was released posthumously in 1984.

By 1968, the practice of releasing LPs in monophonic sound was being discontinued. As a result, RCA Victor issued very few mono copies of Elvis' Gold Records Vol. 4 and they are considered valuable collector's items.

Since these songs had been recorded over a period of several years, the album had several producers, including Steve Sholes, Joseph Lilley, Chet Atkins, Urban Thielmann, George Stoll, Presley himself, and Felton Jarvis.

Reissues
RCA first reissued the original 12 track album on compact disc in 1989. The 1997 reissue added six bonus tracks and altered the running order. "Rock-A-Hula Baby" dated from the 1961 soundtrack to Blue Hawaii, pulled off that album as the flip to accompany "Can't Help Falling In Love" as a single. Three tracks were the advance singles for their respective soundtracks: "Bossa Nova Baby" for Fun in Acapulco; "Kissin' Cousins" for its album; and "Return to Sender", released a month before Girls! Girls! Girls!. "Viva Las Vegas" (the flipside to "What'd I Say"), by the team of Doc Pomus and Mort Shuman, would prove a more durable Elvis recording, receiving myriad cover versions including those by the Dead Kennedys, Bruce Springsteen, and Nine Inch Nails. The gospel song "Crying in the Chapel" had been recorded during the sessions for His Hand in Mine, this five-year-old track going to number three and selling a million copies as a single in 1965.

Track listing
Chart positions for singles taken from Billboard Pop Singles chart.

Personnel

 Elvis Presley − vocals; guitar on "Lonely Man," "A Mess of Blues," and "Ain't That Lovin' You Baby"
 Scotty Moore – rhythm guitar except "What'd I Say," "A Mess of Blues," and "Ain't That Lovin' You Baby," lead guitar on "A Mess of Blues"
 Hank Garland − lead guitar on "Ain't That Lovin' You Baby", bass on "A Mess of Blues"
 Barney Kessell − guitar
 Chet Atkins − guitar on "Ain't That Lovin' You Baby"
 Billy Strange − lead guitar
 Glen Campbell − guitar on "What'd I Say"
 Tiny Timbrell − guitar
 Chip Young − guitar on "Indescribably Blue" and "Love Letters"
 Harold Bradley − acoustic lead guitar on "Indescribably Blue", guitar on "Please Don't Drag That String Around," tic-tac bass guitar on "(You're the) Devil in Disguise"
 Grady Martin − lead guitar on "Please Don't Drag That String Around" and "(You're the) Devil in Disguise"
 Pete Drake − steel guitar on "Indescribably Blue"
 Floyd Cramer − piano, organ
 Dudley Brooks − piano
 David Briggs − piano
 Artie Cane − piano
 Calvin Jackson − organ
 Henry Slaughter − organ
 Bob Moore − bass
 Ray Siegel − bass
 Meyer Rubin − bass
 D. J. Fontana − drums
 Buddy Harman – drums, tympani
 Hal Blaine − drums
 Frank Carlson − drums
 Boots Randolph − saxophone
 Rufus Long − saxophone
 Steve Douglas − saxophone on "What'd I Say"
 The Jordanaires − backing vocals
 Millie Kirkham − backing vocals
 Dolores Edgin − backing vocals
 June Page − backing vocals

Charts

Album

Certifications and sales

Notes

References

External links
 
LPM−3921 Elvis' Gold Records − Volume 4 Guide (monaural) part of The Elvis Presley Record Research Database
LSP−3921 Elvis' Gold Records − Volume 4 Guide (stereo) part of The Elvis Presley Record Research Database

1968 greatest hits albums
Albums produced by Steve Sholes
Albums produced by Felton Jarvis
Elvis Presley compilation albums
RCA Victor compilation albums